Bassols is a surname of Catalan origin. It can refer to:

People 
 Claudia Bassols (born 1979), Spanish actress from Catalonia
 Isabel Gómez-Bassols, Cuban-born American psychologist and writer
 Marina Bassols Ribera (born 1999), Catalan tennis player
 Narciso Bassols (1897–1959), Mexican Politician
 Ramón Lázaro de Dou y de Bassols (1742—1832), Spanish professor and priest
 Xavier Montsalvatge i Bassols (1912—2002), Spanish composer and music critic

Other 
 Bassols 1790, probably the oldest still active textile company in the world

Catalan-language surnames